The Raj Hamsa X-Air is an Indian, two-seat, high-wing, tricycle gear, tractor configuration, ultralight aircraft produced by Raj Hamsa Ultralights of Bangalore, Karnataka in kit form, for amateur construction.

Design and development
The X-Air started as a development of the Chotia Weedhopper redesigned to incorporate ailerons and an enclosed cabin. After initial production in Europe manufacturing was shifted to Raj Hamsa in India. In many countries the aircraft is known as the Rand Kar X-Air. In the USA it is sometimes referred to as the Light Wing X-Air. The aircraft was later developed into the more conventional X-Air Hanuman, which relocated the engine from the upper keel tube to the nose.

The X-Air is built from bolted aluminium tubing, mated to a central welded steel cockpit cage. The wings and tail surfaces are covered in pre-sewn Dacron sailcloth envelopes. The aircraft is built around its keel, a large tube that runs from the high-mounted engine in the front to the tail in the back. The wings are supported by V-struts with jury struts. The landing gear incorporates oleo shock absorbers on all three wheels. The nosewheel is steerable and mainwheel brakes are standard. Dual controls are standard, but cockpit doors are optional. The cockpit has been criticized by reviewer Andre Cliche as "a bit difficult to access".

The X-Air can be fitted with either floats or skis. Engines from  can be fitted, provided they weigh under . The construction time is estimated at 40 hours.

Operational history
Due to its low price and BCAR Section "S" certification the X-Air has proven popular in the United Kingdom.

An X-Air has been used as a testbed for the prototype D-Motor LF26 flathead engine.

Variants
X-Air "S" (Standard)
Initial version, certified under UK BCAR Section "S" as a microlight. Standard engine is the  Rotax 582 and the  Rotax 912UL,  Jabiru 2200 and the  HKS 700E four-stroke powerplants are also used. The design is popular in the UK, especially with the Jabiru engine.
X-Air "F" Gumnam
Improved version, aerodynamically cleaned up, extended fuselage with baggage compartment, Lexan doors and wheel pants are standard. The wing is  shorter, with a higher aspect ratio, 100% double surface, flaps and a NACA 4412 airfoil. Certified under UK BCAR Section "S" as a microlight and marketed in the UK as the X-Air Falcon. Standard engine is the  Rotax 582, although the  Rotax 503 or  Jabiru 2200 four-stroke engine can be used.
X-Air "H" Hanuman
Development version, with nose-mounted  Jabiru 2200 four-stroke engine.

Specifications (X-Air "S")

See also

References

External links

Official website
Official website for the USA

1990s Indian sport aircraft
1990s Indian ultralight aircraft
1990s Indian civil utility aircraft